Through self-Turkification and Assimilation in the Turkish culture over centuries, this Muslim Roma (Turkophilia Horahane) have adopted the Turkish language and loss Romani, in order to establish a Turkish Identity to become more recognized by the Host population and deny there Romani background to show there Turkishness. At Population Census the majority declared themself as Turks instead as Roma and said How happy is the one who says I am a Turk. They are Cultural Muslims who adopted Sunni Islam of Hanafi madhab and Religious male circumcision at the time of the Anatolian Seljuk Sultanate and Ottoman Empire. 
Their legendary leader was Mansur ibn Yakub Han, called Çingene Han. He built his karavansaray in Malatya in 1224. Today it can still be seen as a ruin. Mansur bin Yakup Han is buried in the Ulu Mosque in Malatya.

History
Hamza al-Isfahani wrote about 12.000 Musicians from India who was taken by Bahram Gur to Persia, also did Ferdowsi. Evliya Çelebi told that Mehmed II take after 1453 from Balat, Muslim Gypsies to Istanbul, their descendants became Musicians. They spoke only Turkish with very few Romani words in there jargon. They migrated from Anatolia to Marmara Region and finally settled in the Balkans at the time of the Ottoman Empire. The Greek Doctor A. G. Paspati made the statemant in his Book from 1860, that Turks married often Roma Woman, and the Rumelian Romani dialect is nearly lost by the Muslim Turkish Roma, who speak entirely Turkish.

Settlements and migration 
The majority of Turkish Roma live in Turkey, but also significant Turkish Roma communities live in Bulgaria, Greece (Western Thrace), North Macedonia in lesser case Romania (Dobruja) and Kosovo.

A small Muslim Turkish Roma communitiy live in Dobruja in Romania. They are the descendants of Muslim Roma who intermingled with Turks at the time of Ottoman Empire
Romanian Christian Roma Groups regard them simply as Turks (term for Muslims) and are distinct from them.

In Kosovo live a Turkish Roma community named Divanjoldjije, they are named after there original settlement where they once came from, the Divanyolu Street in Istanbul, and settled in Pristina at the time of the Ottoman Kosovo.

Romanlar in Turkey came to Germany and Austria and other European Countries as Gastarbeiter but they are fully assimilated within the Turks in Europe.

Since Bulgaria became Member in the European Union, Turkish Roma who call themslelfs  Usta Millet and Mehter from Bulgaria went to West Europe as Workers, many of this Turkish Roma Men married Polish Woman. This Offsprings called Melezi (Halfblood), a Turkish Loanword.

References

Romani groups
Romani in Turkey
Romani in Greece
Romani in Cyprus
Romani in Romania
Romani in Kosovo
Romani in North Macedonia
 
Romani religion
Muslims by nationality
Muslim communities in Europe